Norman Cook (March 21, 1955 – December 22, 2008) was an American basketball player.

A 6'8" forward from Lincoln Community High School in Lincoln, Illinois, Cook played basketball at the University of Kansas from 1973 to 1976. He was named the Big Eight Conference's Freshman of the Year in 1974 after averaging 11.4 points per game and helping the Kansas Jayhawks reach the NCAA Final Four. Cook left the University of Kansas after his junior season to make himself eligible for the 1976 NBA Draft, where he was selected by the Boston Celtics. He appeared in 27 games over two seasons with the Celtics and Denver Nuggets, averaging 2.4 points per game.

Cook was haunted by bouts of mental illness.  Cook's son, Brian Cook, has played for several NBA teams.

References

1955 births
2008 deaths
African-American basketball players
American expatriate basketball people in the Netherlands
American men's basketball players
Basketball players at the 1975 Pan American Games
Basketball players from Chicago
Boston Celtics draft picks
Boston Celtics players
Denver Nuggets players
Kansas Jayhawks men's basketball players
Medalists at the 1975 Pan American Games
Pan American Games gold medalists for the United States
Pan American Games medalists in basketball
Power forwards (basketball)
20th-century African-American sportspeople
21st-century African-American people